General Sir John Chalmers McColl,  (born 17 April 1952) is a retired senior British Army officer and a past Lieutenant Governor of Jersey. McColl previously served as Deputy Supreme Allied Commander Europe from 2007 to 2011.

Army career

Educated at Culford School in Suffolk, England, McColl was commissioned as a second lieutenant in the Royal Anglian Regiment in 1973 and promoted to lieutenant on 8 September 1974. He was promoted to captain on 8 March 1979 and to major on 30 September 1984. In 1989, he became a squadron commander in the 3rd Royal Tank Regiment, was promoted to lieutenant colonel on 30 June 1990, and to acting colonel shortly after. He was promoted to colonel on 30 June 1995 and to brigadier on 31 December 1996 (seniority 30 June). He held a variety of commands and military posts before commanding 1st Mechanised Brigade in 1997. In 1999, he became Assistant Chief of Staff at Land Command and in 2000, he was given command of 3rd (UK) Mechanised Division. In 2001, he was appointed the first leader of the International Security Assistance Force in Afghanistan.

In 2003, he became Commandant of the Joint Services Command and Staff College. He was deployed as Senior British Military Representative and Deputy Commanding General, Multinational Force, Iraq in March 2004 and at the end of that year he became Commander of Regional Forces at Land Command. He became Deputy Supreme Allied Commander Europe (DSACEUR) in the rank of general in October 2007, and was appointed Knight Commander of the Order of the Bath (KCB) in the 2008 New Year Honours.

Mccoll was the preferred choice of Afghanistan for the role of U.N. super envoy after they rejected Paddy Ashdown. However, on 7 March 2008, Norwegian diplomat Kai Eide was appointed as the UN representative for Afghanistan. He retired as DSACEUR in March 2011.

Lieutenant Governor of Jersey
On 26 October 2010 it was announced that he would be appointed to the role of Lieutenant Governor of Jersey. He took office on 26 September 2011. On 5 June 2012, Sir John, and his wife Lady McColl, represented Jersey at the Queen's Diamond Jubilee Dedication Service at St Paul's Cathedral. After his fixed term of office, his tenure ended on 30 November 2016 and he was succeeded by Air Chief Marshal Sir Stephen Dalton.

Honours and awards

References

External links
Office of the Lieutenant-Governor

|-

|-

|-

|-

|-

|-

1952 births
British Army generals
British Army personnel of the War in Afghanistan (2001–2021)
Companions of the Distinguished Service Order
Commanders of the Order of the British Empire
Governors of Jersey
Knights Commander of the Order of the Bath
Living people
Officers of the Legion of Merit
People educated at Culford School
Royal Anglian Regiment officers
Royal Tank Regiment officers
NATO military personnel